Sahasrakund Waterfall (also Sahastrakund) is a waterfall on the Painganga River of Nanded district, Maharashtra, India. This town is on the boundary of the Yavatmal and Nanded districts on the Penganga river.

Sahasrakund situated at a distance 172 km from Yavatmal and 100 km from Nanded. It is also 50 km from Nirmal and 100 km from Adilabad.

Attractions
Along with natural scenery, the waterfall is also known for temples around it. Following are the temple around Waterfall:
Panchamukhi Mahadev Temple
Ram temple
Banganga Mahadev Temple

It is considered as important tourist attraction in rainy season. Waterfall is also known for its rock pattern which looks like black metal.

Note
Sahasra is the correct prefix that means "a thousand", not SahasTra. However, it is invariably misspelled as the latter. Notice how the same prefix is spelled when referring to the crown chakra: "Sahasrara Chakra" or when it occurs in family names (example: Sahasrabuddhe) without a T. Also see Sahasralinga. The confusion arises because the Devanagari letter "Sa" (स) merges with "ra" (र) and looks like "tra".

See also
 List of waterfalls of India

References

External links

Photo feature of Waterfall by eSakal

Tourist attractions in Nanded district
 Waterfalls of Maharashtra